Pajo is a district (Indonesian: kecamatan) in the regency (Indonesian: kabupaten) of  Dompu, West Nusa Tenggara, Indonesia.

References

Districts of West Nusa Tenggara
Populated places in West Nusa Tenggara
West Nusa Tenggara